Baron Olivier may refer to two peers, who – although related – held distinct peerages:

 Sydney Olivier, 1st Baron Olivier (1859–1943), British Labour politician
 Laurence Olivier, Baron Olivier (1907–1989), British actor and director; nephew of the above

See also
 Peter Oliver, Baron Oliver of Aylmerton (1921–2007), British judge and barrister

Extinct baronies in the Peerage of the United Kingdom
Noble titles created in 1924
Noble titles created in 1971
Olivier family